Enterprise is an unincorporated community and census-designated place (CDP) in Haskell County, Oklahoma, United States. It was first listed as a CDP following the 2010 census.

The CDP is in western Haskell County. State highways 9 and 71 intersect in the northern part of the community. Highway 9 leads east  to Whitefield and west  to Eufaula, while Highway 71 leads northeast across Eufaula Dam  to Porum and south  to Quinton.

Enterprise is in the valley of Brooken Creek, which flows north to the Canadian River just upstream of Eufaula Dam.

Demographics

Notable people 

 Footsie Blair, (1900-1982) - was a Major League Baseball second baseman for the Chicago Cubs.

References 

Census-designated places in Haskell County, Oklahoma
Census-designated places in Oklahoma